Yeray Sabariego Raja (born 4 June 1993), simply known as Yeray, is a Spanish footballer who plays for FE Grama as a central midfielder.

Club career
Born in Badia del Vallès, Barcelona, Catalonia, Yeray finished his formation with CE Sabadell FC's youth setup, after short stints with neighbours CD Badia del Vallès, RCD Espanyol and UFB Jàbac Terrassa. He was promoted to the reserves in the regional leagues in the 2012 summer.

On 7 September 2013, Yeray played his first match as a professional, starting in a 1–1 away draw against Deportivo Alavés in the Segunda División. On 18 May 2015, he renewed his contract for two more years, after appearing more regularly during the campaign.

On 27 January 2017 Yeray left the Arquelinats by mutual agreement, and joined Granada CF B just hours later.

References

External links

1993 births
Living people
People from Vallès Occidental
Sportspeople from the Province of Barcelona
Spanish footballers
Footballers from Catalonia
Association football midfielders
Segunda División players
Segunda División B players
Tercera División players
CE Sabadell FC B players
CE Sabadell FC footballers
Club Recreativo Granada players
UE Olot players
UE Costa Brava players